Alexander Aleksandrovic Dragunov (Александр Александрович Драгунов; 1900–1955) was a Soviet philologist and Sinologist. 

He is particularly known for his contributions to phonetic reconstruction of the Old Mandarin language of the 12th to 14th centuries and his study of Chinese dialectology. Dragunov was also an early proponent of the 23rd letter of the Tibetan alphabet as representing a voiced fricative in all positions.

References

Works
Dragunov, A. A. 1929. "Binoms of the Type <ni Tsu> in the Tangut-Chinese Dictionary." In <Akad. Nauk Doklady>, series B, 145-8.
Dragunov (1930) "The hPhags-pa Script and Ancient Mandarin" Известия Академии наук СССР. Bulletin de l'Académie des Sciences de l'Union des Républiques Soviétiques Socialistes. VII série. Classe des humanités. 9: 627-647.
Dragunov, Aleksandr A. (1931). "Review of Simon, W., Tibetisch-Chinesische Wortgleichungen." Orientalistische Literaturzeitung 26: 1085-90.
Dragunov, Aleksandr A. (1936). “Voiced plosives and affricates in ancient Tibetan.” Bulletin of the Institute of History and Philology, Academia Sinica 7: 165-174.
Dragunov, Aleksandr A. / Драгунов, Александр А. 1939. Особенности фонологической системы древнетибетского языка / Osobennosti fonologičeskoi sistemy drevnetibetskogo jazyka. [Peculiarities of the Old Tibetan Phonological System.] Записки института востоковеденииа Акад. Наук ССР / Zapiski Instituta vostokovedeniia Akad. Nauk SSR 7: 284-295.
Dragunov, Aleksandr A. Исследования в области дунганской грамматики, ч. 1 — Категория вида и времени в дунганском языке (диалект Ганьсу) [Studies in Dungan Grammar, Part 1 - Category of the form and time in the Dungan language (a dialect of Gansu)], "Труды Ин-та востоковедения АН СССР", 1940, т. 27; "Proceedings of the Institute of Oriental Studies, Academy of Sciences of the USSR", 1940, vol 27.
Dragunov, Aleksandr A. Исследования по грамматике современного китайского языка, т. 1, М.—Л., 1952. [Studies on the grammar of modern Chinese language, so 1, Moscow-Leningrad, 1952]
Грамматическая система современного китайского разговорного языка, Л., 1962. [grammatical system of modern Chinese spoken language, L., 1962]

1900 births
1955 deaths
Soviet sinologists
Philologists